The New Order (Ordem Nova) was a Portuguese neo-fascist political movement that existed between 1978 and 1982.

The organisation was  created by Gilberto Santos e Castro, a former commando leader in Portuguese Angola. The European Parliament report by the Committee of Inquiry Into the Rise of Fascism and Racism in Europe defined its ideology as revolutionary fascist and hyper-nationalist. The report also mentions close links to the Fuerza Nueva in Spain. Disbanded in 1982, it was said to continue its activities underground as of 1985, providing translations of CEDADE publications for distribution in Brazil.

References 

Neo-fascist parties
Defunct political parties in Portugal
Political parties established in 1978
Political parties disestablished in 1982
1978 establishments in Portugal
1982 disestablishments in Portugal